Lawrence Wabara represented the Nigerian national football team in the 1950s.

Personal life
Wabara is the estranged father of the England international footballer Mark Walters, and the English boxer Pelé Reid. His grandson, Reece is also a former professional footballer in the United Kingdom.

References

Nigerian footballers
Nigeria international footballers
Association footballers not categorized by position
Year of birth missing
Nigerian expatriates in England